The Mount Airy Fiddlers Convention is a popular festival devoted to old-time and bluegrass music, as well as related arts such as dance, which takes place each summer at Veterans Memorial Park in Mount Airy, North Carolina, United States. It was established in 1972. It is held on the first weekend in June. The festival features numerous solo and band competitions, whose winners are awarded cash prizes.

Regular performers at the festival include Benton Flippen, the Carolina Chocolate Drops, and Ira Bernstein.

See also

List of bluegrass music festivals 
List of old-time music festivals

References

External links
Official site

Folk festivals in the United States
Music festivals in North Carolina
Festivals in North Carolina
Old-time music festivals
Bluegrass festivals
Tourist attractions in Surry County, North Carolina
Appalachian music
Music festivals established in 1972